Iina Reetta Salmi (born 12 October 1994) is a Finnish professional footballer who plays as a midfielder for Spanish Liga F club Valencia CF and the Finland women's national team. She previously played for PK-35 Vantaa and HJK of the Naisten Liiga, FC Rosengård and AFC Ajax Vrouwen.
Salmi made her debut for the Finland women's national team in March 2016 against Wales. She was also a member of the Finnish squad at the 2014 FIFA U-20 Women's World Cup in Canada and played at the 2013 UEFA Women's Under-19 Championship.

References

External links
 
 
 
 
 Iina Salmi profile at Football Association of Finland (SPL) 

1994 births
Finnish women's footballers
Finnish expatriate footballers
Finnish expatriate sportspeople in Spain
Living people
Finland women's international footballers
Kansallinen Liiga players
FC Rosengård players
Damallsvenskan players
Expatriate women's footballers in Sweden
Finnish expatriate sportspeople in Sweden
Helsingin Jalkapalloklubi (women) players
PK-35 Vantaa (women) players
Footballers from Espoo
Women's association football midfielders
Expatriate women's footballers in the Netherlands
Expatriate women's footballers in Spain